The Worcester Chambers, recently also known as Gough Chambers, is a heritage building in Christchurch, New Zealand. It was designed by Cecil Wood in 1926 and is designated as a Category II heritage building registered by Heritage New Zealand. Located at 69 Worcester Street in Central Christchurch, it was originally the site of a secretarial school called Digby's Commercial College.

2010 and 2011 Canterbury earthquakes 
As a result of earthquake strengthening in 2007 it withstood the Canterbury earthquakes in 2010 and 2011.

Owners 
In September 2015, the building was bought for NZ$2.3m by members of the Gough family: prominent businessman Tracy Gough and two of this children, including Christchurch City Councillor Jamie Gough. The new owners renamed the building Gough Chambers. Although they dropped the rent, they were unable to find tenants and sold the building in late 2016 for NZ$2.18m to lawyer Gerard McCoy and his wife Siu-Wai McCoy.

References 

Commercial buildings completed in 1927
Heritage New Zealand Category 2 historic places in Canterbury, New Zealand
Buildings and structures in Christchurch
Christchurch Central City
1920s architecture in New Zealand